Paul Pinna (3 October 1884 Tallinn – 29 March 1949 Tallinn) was an Estonian actor and stage director.

Since 1899 he started stage activity at the "Estonia" theatre society. 1900s he was related to establish professional Estonia Theatre.

1915-1920 he worked as a military official in Tallinn and played at Estonia Theatre. 1918-1922 he played and worked at Tallinn Drama Theatre.

1936-1940 he was chairman of Estonian Actors' Union.

Paul Pinna was married to stage actress Netty Pinna.

References

1884 births
1949 deaths
Male actors from Tallinn
People from Kreis Harrien
Estonian theatre directors
Estonian male stage actors
Estonian male film actors
People's Artists of the Estonian Soviet Socialist Republic
Burials at Metsakalmistu
Actors from the Russian Empire